Lackey-Overbeck House, also known as the Lackey-Cockefair-Overbeck-Matheis House, is a historic home located at Cambridge City, Wayne County, Indiana.  It was built about 1835, and is a two-story, three bay, frame dwelling with Federal and Greek Revival style design elements.  A two-story rear wing was added about 1850.

It was listed on the National Register of Historic Places in 1976. It is located in the Cambridge City Historic District.

References

Houses on the National Register of Historic Places in Indiana
Federal architecture in Indiana
Greek Revival houses in Indiana
Houses completed in 1835
Buildings and structures in Wayne County, Indiana
National Register of Historic Places in Wayne County, Indiana
Historic district contributing properties in Indiana